This is a list of foreign ministers of the Comoros.

1975............ Ahmed Abdallah
1975–1976: Said Mohamed Jaffar
1976............ Ali Soilih
1976–1978: Abdallah Mouzaoir
1978–1982: Ali Mroudjaé
1982–1990: Said Kafe
1990–1991: Mtara Maécha
1991–1993: Said Hassane Said Hachim
1993............ Athoumane Said Ahmed
1993–1994: Mouslim Ben Moussa
1994–1995: Said Mohamed Sagaf
1995............ Mohamed Abdoulwahab
1995–1996: Abdallah Mouzaoir
1996–1997: Said Omar Said Ahmed
1997............ Mouhtar Ahmed Charif
1997–1998: Ibrahim Ali Mzimba
1998............ Salim Himidi
1998–1999: Nidhoim Attoumane
1999–2002: Mohamed El-Amine Souef
2002............ Halidi Charif
2002–2005: Mohamed El-Amine Souef
2005–2006: Aboudou Soefou
2006–2010: Ahmed Ben Said Jaffar
2010–2011: Fahmi Said Ibrahim
2011–2013: Mohamed Bakri Ben Abdoulfatah Charif
2013–2015: El-Anrif Said Hassane
2015–2016: Abdoulkarim Mohamed
2016–2017: Mohamed Bacar Dossar
2017–2020: Mohamed El-Amine Souef
2020–present: Dhoihir Dhoulkamal

Sources
Rulers.org – Foreign ministers A–D

Foreign
Foreign Ministers
Politicians